Summers Creek is a stream in Bollinger County in the U.S. state of Missouri. It is a tributary of Crooked Creek.

Summers Creek has the name of the local Summers family of settlers.

See also
List of rivers of Missouri

References

Rivers of Bollinger County, Missouri
Rivers of Missouri